Through Her Eyes is a 2017 Nigerian film that was directed and written by Nadine Ibrahim.

Plot
The movie is a short documentary that gives insight about how children in Nigeria are abducted and made to be terrorists. It tries to explain the point that no child is born a terrorist.

Cast
 Aisha Anisah Ayagi

References

2017 films
Nigerian documentary films
English-language Nigerian films